Kneller is a surname. Notable people with the surname include:

Andreas Kneller (1649–1724), German composer
Arthur Kneller (1894–1969), English cricketer
Clive Kneller, actor in Enlightenment
Sir Godfrey Kneller (1646–1723), German-born English portrait painter, brother of Andreas
John Kneller (1916-2009), English-American professor and fifth President of Brooklyn College
Scott Kneller (born 1989), Australian freestyle skier

See also
Kneller Hall, stately home in Twickenham, named after Sir Godfrey